ORP Gniezno (822) is a Lublin-class minelayer-landing ship of Polish Navy, named after the city of Gniezno.

Construction and career 
The ship was commissioned on 23 February 1990 and incorporated into the 2nd Minelaying and Transport Unit of the 8th Coastal Defence Flotilla based in Świnoujście. Halina Ostrzycka became the captain of the ship. The ship took part in many national exercises, visited ports in Germany, Denmark and Norway.

The crew consists of 51 people, including 5 officers. The main tasks of the ship are to build defensive minefields and transport troops and landing techniques by sea. From October 2019, the commander of the ship is Cdr. Przemysław Lizik. 

In 2017 and 2019, the ship took part in the BALTOPS, carrying out an landing on the beach in Ustka on 14 June 2017. In manoeuvres in 2019 the ship sustained damage to the hull plating in the bottom part of the ship, off the coast of Lithuania.

Gallery

References 

Lublin-class minelayer-landing ships
1988 ships
Ships built in Gdańsk